Sergey Karpovich (born 29 March 1994) is a Belarusian professional football player who plays for Neman Grodno.

References

External links
 
 
 Profile at Dinamo Minsk website

1994 births
Living people
Belarusian footballers
Association football defenders
Belarus international footballers
FC Bereza-2010 players
FC Dinamo Minsk players
FC Naftan Novopolotsk players
FC Minsk players
FC Gorodeya players
FC Torpedo-BelAZ Zhodino players
FC Isloch Minsk Raion players
FC Kaisar players
FC Baltika Kaliningrad players
FC Neman Grodno players
Belarusian Premier League players
Belarusian First League players
Kazakhstan Premier League players
Belarusian expatriate footballers
Expatriate footballers in Kazakhstan
Expatriate footballers in Russia